Harry Ross Cochrane (born 24 April 2001) is a Scottish footballer who plays as a midfielder for Queen of the South, having previously played for Heart of Midlothian, as well as loan spells with Dunfermline Athletic and Montrose.

Career

Youth football
Cochrane attended Kirklandpark Primary in Strathaven and later studied at Grange Academy, Kilmarnock where he was part of the Scottish Football Association Performance School. Cochrane began his football career with Rangers, before transferring to Heart of Midlothian at under-13 level.

Hearts
In June 2017 Cochrane signed a professional contract with Hearts, which committed him to the club until 2020. The following month he played in all four of the first team's pre season friendlies, netting in a 4–1 win against Linfield. On 15 August 2017, Cochrane played for Hearts Under-20s in the Scottish Challenge Cup against Formartine United. He made his first team debut for Hearts, aged 16, on 30 September 2017, playing from the start in a 2–1 defeat against Dundee at Dens Park. In doing so he became the first Scottish Football Association Performance School graduate to start a Scottish Premiership game.

Cochrane scored the opening goal in Hearts' 4–0 win over Celtic on 17 December 2017, a result that ended Celtic's 69-game unbeaten run in domestic matches. In doing so he became the club's youngest league goalscorer. The following week he was sent off in a match against St Johnstone for a second bookable offence. In April 2018, Cochrane signed a new contract with Hearts, which ran until 2021.

Cochrane, along with Hearts teammate Anthony McDonald, moved on a season-long loan to Scottish Championship side Dunfermline Athletic on 30 August 2019.

On 30 October 2020, Cochrane joined Scottish League One club Montrose on loan until January 2021. The loan agreement was later extended to the end of the season.

In April 2021, it was announced that Cochrane was set to leave Heart of Midlothian at the end of the season following the expiration of his contract.

Queen of the South
On 24 July 2021, Cochrane signed a two-year deal with Scottish Championship club Queen of the South after a successful trial period.

International career
He was a member of the Scotland under-16 Victory Shield squad. He was called up to represent Scotland at under-17 level in October 2017, however was withdrawn from the squad by Hearts manager Craig Levein, as he felt the "experience of being involved and perhaps playing in the first team at this minute in his career is more valuable than playing an international game."

Career statistics

References

2001 births
Living people
People from Strathaven
Footballers from Glasgow
People educated at Grange Academy, Kilmarnock
Scottish footballers
Association football midfielders
Rangers F.C. players
Heart of Midlothian F.C. players
Dunfermline Athletic F.C. players
Scottish Professional Football League players
Scotland youth international footballers
Montrose F.C. players
Queen of the South F.C. players
Footballers from South Lanarkshire